Heistesoo is a village in Hiiumaa Parish, Hiiu County in northwestern Estonia.

The village is first mentioned in about 1900 (Хейстесоо). Historically, the village was part of Kõrgessaare Manor.

After 1940s the village was merged with Suureranna village, but in 1997 Heistesoo village is restored.

References

Villages in Hiiu County